Jean-Claude Cameroun (born June 7, 1973) is a Cameroonian judoka.

Achievements

References

1973 births
Living people
Cameroonian male judoka
Judoka at the 2000 Summer Olympics
Judoka at the 2004 Summer Olympics
Olympic judoka of Cameroon
African Games medalists in judo
Competitors at the 2003 All-Africa Games
African Games silver medalists for Cameroon
20th-century Cameroonian people
21st-century Cameroonian people